ASC Mauritel Mobile FC is a Mauritanean football club founded in 2003 based in Nouakchott.

Achievements
Mauritanean Premier League: 2
2000, 2006

Coupe du Président de la République: 1
2007

Performance in CAF competitions
CAF Champions League: 1 appearance
2007 – Preliminary Round

CAF Cup Winners' Cup: 1 appearance
1996 – disqualified in Preliminary Round

External links
Team profile – Soccerway.com

Football clubs in Mauritania
Association football clubs established in 2003
2003 establishments in Mauritania